Regional Institute of Paramedical and Nursing Sciences (RIPANS) is located at Zemabawk, Aizawl on the slope of a hill donated by the government of Mizoram.

Location

RIPANS is surrounded by National Highway 54 on the southeast and a hospital and health departmental store on the northwest. The nearest airport is Lengpui Airport. The city bus of Aizawl regularly services Zemabawk where RIPANS is located.

History
To overcome the need to provide basic paramedical health care facilities in the health institution of the North Eastern Regions, Regional Institute of Paramedical & Nursing Sciences was finalized by the North Eastern Council in 1992-93 with the approval of the government of India. All the allotted seats in disciplines of the institute is distributed as per quota fixed for to the beneficiary states. RIPANS was established in 1996 at project cost of Rs.2315.39 lakhs during the 9th Five Year Plan. Since the inception, a Medical Laboratory Technology certificate course of  years' duration was started in the institute

Formerly the name was Regional Paramedical and Nursing Training Institute (RP&NTI), which was rechristened as Regional Institute of Paramedical and Nursing (RIPAN). Later the word 'sciences' was added. The institute is named Regional Institute of Paramedical and Nursing Sciences (RIPANS). RIPANS is affiliated to Mizoram University. RIPANS is planning to start a 100-seat MBBS and BDS seat learning center for which project estimate has been submitted.

Departments

RIPANS offers the following courses: 
B.Sc. Nursing
B.Pharmacy	
B.Sc Medical Lab Technology(BSc.MLT/BMLS) 	
Bachelor's in Optometry & Ophthalmic Techniques	
Bachelor's in Radiography & Imaging Technology
M.Pharmacy
MSc MLT/MMLS{Medical Microbiology, Pathology(Histo and Cyto), Clinical Biochemistry and Hematology and BB specializations}
PhD in pharmacy

M.Pharm courses were started in 2016. 
M.Pharm in Pharmaceutics, Pharmacology, Pharmaceutical Chemistry, Pharmacognosy & Phytochemistry 
MSc MLT specializations were also started in the year 2021

References

External links
 

Universities and colleges in Mizoram
Colleges affiliated to Mizoram University
Education in Aizawl
Pharmacy schools in India
Nursing schools in India